Rhizophydiales are an important group of chytrid fungi. They are found in soil as well as marine and fresh water habitats where they function as parasites and decomposers.

Role in the environment

Rhizophydiales are parasites of a range of organisms, including invertebrates, other chytrids and algae, and they may have a role in natural control of aquatic populations, especially phytoplankton. One member, Rhizophydium graminis, is a parasite of wheat roots, but causes no extensive damage to the plant.  The only documented cases of a chytrid parasitizing vertebrates are Batrachochytrium dendrobatidis and Batrachochytrium salamandrivorans, members of this order. They are highly destructive pathogens of frogs and salamanders respectively.

The majority of the described saprotrophic species of this order are biodegraders of pollen, with only a few growing on keratin, chitin, and cellulose. The transformational role of the Rhizophydiales in aquatic food webs is little studied but recently more recognized.

Life history

Their thalli (=bodies) consist of two parts: an absorptive branching rhizoidal system that contains no nuclei and a multinucleate sporangium that ranges in shape from spherical, to oval, to pear-shaped, and to multi-lobed. The rhizoids attach the thallus to a substrate (food source) and absorbs nutrients.  When the thallus is fully grown, the sporangium releases numerous, unwalled, uninucleate-zoospores, each bearing a single posteriorly directed flagellum.

The zoospore has to use its own stored food reserves (lipids and glycogen) as it swims until it attaches to a suitable host or substrate, absorbs its flagellum, produces a wall around itself, grows a germ tube that penetrates the substrate, and develops into a new thallus. Zoospores of parasitic chytrids use light and chemical cues to locate hosts.  Zoospores of Rhizophydium littoreum, a parasite of marine green algae, are positively phototactic toward blue light, a mechanism that might assure that zoospores swim to the photic zone where its host resides. Zoospores of both R.  littoreum and B. dendrobatidis exhibit chemotaxis to specific sugars, proteins and amino acids, also a mechanism by which zoospores might detect signals to potential hosts.
 
Sexual reproduction is more rarely reported and occurs when two adjacent sporangia function as gametangia with one transferring all of its cytoplasmic contents into the other, resulting in the development of a thick-walled, lipid-laden resting spore.

Phylogeny
Based on the work of "The Mycota: A Comprehensive Treatise on Fungi as Experimental Systems for Basic and Applied Research", Powell and Letcher 2015

Taxonomic classification
The Rhizophydiales is an order of fungi that includes the following families and genera:
 Aquamycetaceae Letcher 2008
 Aquamyces Letcher 2008
 Alphamycetaceae Letcher 2008
 Alphamyces Letcher 2008
 Betamyces Letcher 2012
 Gammamyces Letcher 2012
 Angulomycetaceae Letcher 2008
 Angulomyces Letcher 2008
 Batrachochytriaceae Doweld 2013
 Batrachochytrium Longcore, Pessier & D.K. Nichols 1999 (no clear relatives known in 2007)
 Homolaphlyctis Longcore, Letcher & T.Y. James 2011 
 Coralloidiomycetaceae Doweld 2014
 Coralloidiomyces Letcher 2008
 Dinomycetaceae Karpov & Guillou 2014
 Dinomyces Karpov & Guillou 2014
 Globomycetaceae Letcher 2008
 Globomyces Letcher 2008
 Urceomyces Letcher 2008
 Gorgonomycetaceae Letcher 2008
 Gorgonomyces Letcher 2008
 Halomycetaceae Letcher & Powell 2015
Halomyces (Amon) Letcher & M.J. Powell 2015
Paludomyces Letcher & M.J. Powell 2015
Paranamyces Letcher & M.J. Powell 2015
Ulkenomyces Letcher & M.J. Powell 2015
 Kappamycetaceae Letcher 2006
 Kappamyces Letcher & M.J. Powell 2005
 Operculomycetaceae Doweld 2014
 Operculomyces M.J.Powell, Letcher & Longcore 2011
 Pateramycetaceae Letcher 2008
 Pateramyces Letcher 2008
 Protrudomycetaceae Letcher 2008
 Protrudomyces Letcher 2008
 Rhizophydiaceae Werderm. 1954 [Tylochytriaceae Doweld 2014]
 Rhizophydium Schenk 1858
 Staurastromycetaceae Van den Wyngaert et al. 2017
 Staurastromyces Van den Wyngaert et al. 2017
 Terramycetaceae Letcher 2006
 Boothiomyces Letcher 2006
 Terramyces Letcher 2006
 Uebelmesseromycetaceae Powell & Letcher 2015
 Uebelmesseromyces Powell & Letcher 2015

Biodiversity
New species and genera are still being discovered in this order. A member of this order, Kappamyces, was the first phylogenetic genus of a chytrid  circumscribed based primarily on monophyly demonstrated in molecular sequence analysis and confirmed with unique zoospore structure  Coralloidiomyces digitatus defied the original view held that the thallus of members of the Rhizophydiales was conservative. Collected from submersed mud at the edge of an oligotrophic lake in southern Argentina near the Andes in Patagonia, C.  digitatus  has a thallus with a sporangium shaped like a coral.

References

External links 

 Chytrid Fungi Online: by the University of Alabama
 Rhizophydiales
 Impact of chytrid fungus on frogs (Foundation for National Parks & Wildlife)

Chytridiomycota